Anhangueridae is a group of pterosaurs within the suborder Pterodactyloidea. They were among the last pterosaurs to possess teeth. A recent study discussing the group considered the Anhangueridae to be typified by a premaxillary crest and a lateral expansion in the distal rostrum. The same study presented a cladistic analysis, for which an "agreement subtree" was calculated. The Anhangueridae was found to be sister taxon to the large crested Tropeognathus.

Relationships
There are competing theories of ornithocheiromorph phylogeny (evolutionary relationships). Below is cladogram following a topology recovered by Brian Andres, using the most recent iteration of his data set. 

The cladogram below follows Pêgas et al. (2019), who recovered Anhangueridae as a much more inclusive group. The analysis found most of the ornithocheirids falling into this family, while Ornithocheirus itself was recovered as a basal member of Ornithocheirae.

References

Pteranodontoids
Early Cretaceous first appearances
Late Cretaceous extinctions
Prehistoric reptile families